The 2002 San Francisco 49ers season was the team's 57th season, and 53rd in the National Football League.

The first season following divisional realignment, the 49ers won the new-look NFC West title with a 10–6 record; they swept their new division rivals, the Seattle Seahawks and the Arizona Cardinals while splitting with the St. Louis Rams. In the Wild Card round, the 49ers fell behind the New York Giants 38–14 but erupted with 25 unanswered points and survived a chaotic last-second field goal attempt by the Giants; the 39–38 win was the 26th playoff win in the team's history and as of 2019, it is the fourth biggest comeback in NFL playoff history. The 49ers lost the next week in the divisional round to the eventual Super Bowl champion Tampa Bay Buccaneers 31–6 and head coach Steve Mariucci was fired, the result of a power struggle with owner John York and new general manager Terry Donahue. 2002 was the last winning season for the 49ers until 2011.

Offseason

NFL Draft

Personnel

Staff

Roster

Regular season

Schedule

Game Summaries

Week 1: at New York Giants 
At Giants Stadium the 49ers clawed to a 13–6 lead on three Kerry Collins interceptions, but a late Tiki Barber score tied the game 13–13. Two Jeff Garcia passes for 45 yards and three Garrison Hearst runs for seven yards set up Jose Cortez's 36-yard field goal with ten seconds left and the 16–13 49ers win.

Week 2: vs. Denver Broncos 
Despite an eight-yard touchdown to Terrell Owens (suffering from a season-long groin issue), Jeff Garcia struggled in San Francisco's home opener, fumbling in the third quarter then throwing an interception to Deltha O'Neal in the fourth. A late rushing score by Garcia made the final score 24–14 for the Broncos.
|Weather= 68 °F (Sunny)

Week 3: vs. Washington Redskins 

Jeff Garcia and Tim Rattay combined for just 125 passing yards as the Niners defeated the Redskins 20–10. Food poisoning forced Garcia out of the game. "I just didn't feel real crisp," Garcia said in the postgame press conference.
|Weather= 71 °F (Sunny)

Week 5: vs. St. Louis Rams 
The Rams' collapse following their loss in Super Bowl XXXVI continued as Jamie Martin started and was intercepted twice. Garrison Hearst and Kevan Barlow rushed for 166 yards as the Niners pummeled the Rams 37–13.
|Weather= 84 °F (Sunny)

Week 6: at Seattle Seahawks 

On Monday Night Football Terrell Owens caught two touchdowns, including what turned out to be the game-winner in the final eight minutes. After one touchdown Owens took out a magic marker and autographed the football before giving it to one of his assistants in the endzone grandstands, a maneuver that caused a stir in football circles. The win was only the second for the Niners over their former offensive coordinator Mike Holmgren as a head coach.

Week 7: at New Orleans Saints 
The 4–1 49ers faced the 5–1 Saints for the first time since divisional realignment split the two clubs out of the NFC West and formed the new NFC South. The two clubs put up a combined 840 yards of offense; the Niners led 24–13 after three quarters but the Saints outscored San Francisco 22–3 in the fourth quarter; Jeff Garcia was intercepted with 2:30 to go and Aaron Brooks ran in a one-yard touchdown for the 35–27 Saints win.

Week 8: vs. Arizona Cardinals 
Four rushing touchdowns (two of them from Marcel Shipp) were not enough for the Cardinals against the Niners as Jeff Garcia tossed four touchdowns and Jake Plummer was intercepted three times in a 38–28 San Francisco win.
|Weather= 67 °F (Sunny)

Week 9: at Oakland Raiders 
The two Bay Area teams clashed in an overtime grinder as Rich Gannon threw for 164 yards and a one-yard touchdown to Jerry Porter. Garcia threw for 282 yards and two scores and rushed for 46 yards, 21 of them in overtime following a missed 27-yard Jose Cortez field goal attempt at the end of regulation. Cortez nailed the 23-yard kick in overtime for the 23–20 49ers win.

Week 10: vs. Kansas City Chiefs 

The Niners faced former Rams coach Dick Vermeil, whose Chiefs had scored at least 34 points five times to that point of the season; they were held to 13 points and 256 yards of offense as the Niners ground out the 17–13 win.

Week 11: at San Diego Chargers 
At San Diego Terrell Owens caught two touchdowns, one a 76-yard bomb, but the Niners blew a 17–7 lead to the Chargers as Drew Brees' touchdown to Fred McCrary with 31 seconds to go tied the game, and former Buffalo Bill Steve Christie won it with 4:11 to go in overtime on a 40-yard field goal. The two teams combined for 908 yards of offense.

Week 12: vs. Philadelphia Eagles 
Despite putting up 409 yards of offense the Niners were pounded by the Eagles 38–17 as Koy Detmer and A. J. Feeley combined for three touchdown throws; Detmer added a rushing score and Brian Mitchell ran back a 76-yard punt for a touchdown. Future Eagle Terrell Owens caught two touchdown passes from Jeff Garcia.
|Weather= 68 °F (Clear)

Week 13: vs. Seattle Seahawks 
The Niners raced to a 31–10 lead behind three Garrison Hearst touchdown runs and a punt return score. In the fourth quarter Matt Hasselbeck (who had 427 passing yards in all) scored twice on passes to Koren Robinson and Darrell Jackson but was intercepted with 1:31 to go, ensuring the 31–24 Niners win.
|Weather= 60 °F (Sunny)

Week 14: at Dallas Cowboys 
Though the championship rivalry of a decade past had cooled off with the fall of the Cowboys to sub-mediocrity, the game at Texas Stadium nonetheless resembled Cowboy-49er clashes of yore. Despite intercepting Chad Hutchinson twice, the 49ers saw the lead change four times before the Cowboys surged to a 27–17 lead in the fourth quarter. Jeff Garcia then stormed the 49ers to the win on touchdowns to Tai Streets and a bobbling eight-yard catch by Terrell Owens with fifteen seconds remaining. In the 31–27 49ers win the two teams combined for 35 fourth-quarter points.

Week 15: vs. Green Bay Packers 

The Niners’ perennial struggles against the Packers since Green Bay's 1995 playoff win continued with San Francisco's tenth loss in eleven meetings. Terrell Owens caught a pass and bulled off a defender into the end zone; after scoring he took the pom poms of a Niners cheerleader and celebrated. On the Niners final drive Garcia drove to the Packers 14 (gaining a first down on a run and despite running into a Packers assistant coach on the sideline) but was stopped on fourth down.

Week 16: at Arizona Cardinals 
The Niners held the Cardinals to just 184 yards of offense in a 17–14 Niners win. Terrell Owens did not play.

Week 17: at St. Louis Rams 
Having clinched the NFC West, the Niners rested many starters against the Rams as Jeff Garcia threw only three passes and Tim Rattay threw a pair of touchdowns to Tai Streets. The Rams played to salvage a win in their disappointing season and exploded for 28 fourth-quarter points to win 31–20; the Rams thus finished 7–9 while the Niners were 10–6.

Standings

Playoffs

Schedule

Game Summaries

NFC Wild Card Playoffs: vs. New York Giants 

The Steelers' comeback earlier in the day (36–33 over the Cleveland Browns) was matched by San Francisco's similar late drive, overcoming a 38–14 deficit by scoring 25 unanswered points in the second half. A last-minute Giants drive collapsed when Trey Junkin botched a field goal snap, leading to a desperation heave to the endzone that fell short. There were two notable events in this game. The first one was when after the 49ers scored a touchdown, Terrell Owens caught a pass from Jeff Garcia for the two-point conversion. After the catch, Owens did a little showboating. Michael Strahan of the Giants went up to Owens and pointed to the scoreboard and mocked Owens. (At the time, the Giants led 38–22.) This is significant because the 49ers came back to win. After the 49ers scored another touchdown and made the score 38–30, Joe Buck remarked "The scoreboard doesn't look so great to Strahan anymore." The second event in the game was that in the 3rd quarter, Jeremy Shockey dropped a touchdown pass that would have put the Giants up 42–14. Instead, the Giants had to kick a field goal, making the score 38–14. Nobody at the time knew how big of a mistake this dropped pass would be for the Giants, and how big of a blessing for the 49ers.
The win was the 26th in a playoff game for the club and the last until the 2011 divisional playoffs.

NFC Divisional Playoffs: at Tampa Bay Buccaneers – January 12, 2003 

The Buccaneers, with the league's top-ranked defense during the 2002 regular season, forced five turnovers, sacked quarterback Jeff Garcia four times, and limited the 49ers to only two field goals. Tampa Bay quarterback Brad Johnson, who had been sidelined for a month, returned to throw for 196 yards and two touchdowns. Fullback Mike Alstott scored two touchdowns, while the Buccaneers held onto the ball for 36:46 and held the 49ers to a season low 228 yards. This was San Francisco's first playoff game without a touchdown since 1986.
Despite San Francisco's 10–6 record and their Wild Card playoff win against New York, coach Steve Mariucci was fired three days after this game. The 49ers would not return to the playoffs until 2011.

References 

 49ers on Pro Football Reference
 49ers Schedule on jt-sw.com

San Francisco 49ers
NFC West championship seasons
San Francisco 49ers seasons
2002 in San Francisco
San